Jianhe may refer to:

Locations
Jianhe County, a county in Guizhou, China
Jianhe Township, Muchuan County (建和乡), a township in Muchuan County, Sichuan, China
Jianhe Township, Yanting County (剑河乡), a township in Yanting County, Sichuan, China
Jianhe Subdistrict, Taiyuan (涧河街道), a subdistrict in Xinghualing District, Taiyuan, Shanxi, China
Jianhe Subdistrict, Sanmenxia (涧河街道), a subdistrict in Hubin District, Sanmenxia, Henan, China

Historical eras
Jianhe (147–149), era name used by Emperor Huan of Han
Jianhe (400–402), era name used by Tufa Lilugu, Southern Liang ruler